The Flag of Devon, properly St Petroc's Cross, is the flag of the English county of Devon. It is dedicated to Saint Petroc, a local saint with numerous dedications throughout Devon. It is notable for its creation through two web-based polls.

History
The subject of a Devonian flag was raised by the country's contingent of scouts to the 20th World Scout Jamboree in an interview on BBC Radio Devon in 2002. The scouts were unaware of a Devon flag and wondered if any listeners knew of a flag for the county. BBC Radio Devon took up the search for a flag for Devon and asked the public to send in designs.

The flag was created in 2003 after a vote in two polls run by the BBC Devon website, the winning design taking 49% of the votes cast. The design was created by student Ryan Sealey.

The Devon Flag is made of three colours — green (Pantone 348), black and white. Although the flag is relatively young, its colours are those traditionally identified with Devon (e.g. the colours of its Rugby Union team, Exeter University and Plymouth Argyle F.C.). In 1816, Lord Exmouth flew a dark green flag with white circles at the Bombardment of Algiers (now on view at the Teign Valley Museum). The green represents the colour of the rolling and lush Devon hills, the black represents the high and windswept moors (Dartmoor and Exmoor) and the white represents both the salt spray of Devon's two coastlines and the China Clay industry (and mining in general).

Since its launch in 2003, the Devon Flag has gained popularity, and in October 2006 it gained "official" recognition when Devon County Council raised the flag outside County Hall.

In April 2004, a resident of Ottery St Mary in East Devon was threatened with legal action for flying the Devon flag in his back garden, as he required planning permission to fly non-national flags. Since then the Minister for Housing, Keith Hill, has said local authorities can officially "turn a blind eye" to the practice of flying the county flag from poles.

Devon Ensign

First flown in 2003, the Devon Regatta Ensign (designed by Kevin Pyne) adds a Union flag into the Canton of the Devon Flag. This flag is described as for use at regatta, high days and holidays, weddings, and burials at sea.

Flying the Devon Flag
The Devon Flag Group have suggested the following dates as days when it is appropriate for the Devon flag to be flown. Most of them are either the days of local events or the feast days of Devon's saints. It is also flown outside of these days, especially in rural towns.

4 January - St Rumon of Tavistock and Romansleigh
7 January - St Brannock of Braunton
5 March - St Piran, patron saint of tin miners
12 March - Paul Aurelian, brother of St Sidwell
7 April - St Brannock, as celebrated in Exeter
1 May - Saint Walpurga of Devon
May Bank Holiday, Anniversary of first time Devon Flag Flown at World Gig Championship 2003, Isles of Scilly
May/June - Devon County Show
3 June - St Kevin
4 June - St Petroc 
5 June - St Boniface of Crediton, Patron Saint of Devon
6 June - St Gudwal, hermit of Devon
17 June - St Nectan, patron of Hartland
21/22 June - Midsummers day
26 June - St Brannock - another feast day
5 July - Exeter Lammas Fair
8 July - St Urith of Chittlehampton
13 July - St Juthware
30 July - Anniversary of battle against Spanish Armada
1 August - St Sidwell, Patron Saint of Exeter
10 August - St Geraint Last King of Dumnonia
30 August - St Rumon
26 September - Anniversary of Sir Francis Drake's Circumnavigation of the World
2 November - St Cumgar
5 November - St Kea
7 November - St Congar
8 December - St Budoc (St Budeaux) of Plymouth
12 December - St Corentin
16 December - Saint Judicael, King of Domnonée
21/22 December - Midwinter
31 Dec to 6 Jan - New Year's Eve to Twelfth Night

Controversy
The creation of the flag drew criticism from Cornish nationalists, who accused it online of being an attempt to "hijack" their culture.

Bob Burns, who started the discussion over a flag for Devon, cited the visibility of the Cornish Flag as one of his reasons "Devonians are only too aware of the ubiquitous Cornish Flag, which can often be seen in the form of car bumper stickers, on vehicles entering Devon from Cornwall."

Dr Mark Stoyle, a Devon historian, noted that "People are quite aware in Devon that the Cornish make political capital by claiming to be different". He also suggested that the new-found sense of Devonian identity was a backlash against incoming "city-dwellers settling in the South West".

The decision to dedicate the flag to St Petroc was not without controversy as the saint is equally popular in neighbouring Cornwall, but it was decided that as Devon's 27 church dedications to Saint Petroc far outweighs the 6 dedications in Cornwall, and furthermore that the Devon villages named after the Saint, such as Petrockstowe and Newton St Petroc, gave the county a strong claim to the saint, as Cornwall had already selected Saint Piran as their patron saint many years previously.

See also
Devon heraldry

References

Devon
Local government in Devon
Devon
Flags of saints
Devon
Devon